Gabaret Island, also known as Cabaret Island, situated approximately  due north of the Gateway Arch in St. Louis, Missouri, and approximately  south of the confluence of the Missouri River and Mississippi River, is one of a cluster of three islands: Chouteau Island, Gabaret Island, and Mosenthein Island. Gabaret Island is 1,300 acres in area. Due to land development, the island is continuous with its northern neighbor, Chouteau Island, but is separated by a slough (Gabaret Slough).

Lewis and Clark camped on Gabaret Island on December 11, 1803, prior to establishing Camp Dubois near Wood River, Illinois.

References

Islands of the Mississippi River
River islands of Illinois
Tourist attractions in Madison County, Illinois